Backstreet is a 1983 album by David Sanborn. The album peaked at number one on the Billboard Traditional Jazz albums chart on January 27, 1984.

Track listing

Personnel 
 David Sanborn – alto saxophone, soprano saxophone, alto sax solos
 Marcus Miller – acoustic piano, Rhodes piano, Roland Jupiter-8, Yamaha GS2, Oberheim OB-Xa, vocoder, Moog bass, acoustic guitar, electric guitar, rhythm guitar, guitar solo, Fender bass, fretless bass, percussion, steel drums, timpani, backing vocals (1, 3), BGV arrangements (1)
 Michael Colina – acoustic piano (1, 2, 4, 6), Oberheim OB-Xa (1, 2, 4, 6), Roland Jupiter-8 (1, 2, 4, 6), vocoder (1, 2, 4, 6)
 Hiram Bullock – Fender Rhodes (1), Yamaha GS2 (1), Moog bass (1), electric guitar (1), rhythm guitar (1), guitar solo (1)
 Steve Gadd – drums (1, 4)
 Ralph MacDonald – congas (2, 8), percussion (2, 8)
 Barry Johnson – backing vocals (3)
 Tawatha Agee – backing vocals (8)
 Yvonne Lewis – backing vocals (8)
 Luther Vandross – backing vocals (8)

Production 
 Marcus Miller – producer 
 Michael Colina – producer
 Ray Bardani – producer, recording, mixing
 Bruce Robbins – assistant engineer, technical maintenance 
 Wayne Warnecke – assistant engineer
 George Marino – mastering at Sterling Sound (New York City, New York).
 Katherine Jewel – music contractor
 Shirley Klein – album coordinator
 Marc Silag – assistant production manager 
 Simon Levy – art direction 
 Laura LiPuma – design 
 Lou Beach – front cover college 
 Desiree Rohr – back cover illustration 
 Patrick Raines & Associates – management

Charts

References

1982 albums
Warner Records albums
David Sanborn albums
Albums produced by Michael Colina
Albums produced by Marcus Miller